Pedrinho, full name Pedro Aparecido Santana, is a retired Brazilian football player.

Club career
Pedrinho played for Edessaikos in the Greek second division.

He retired after he was released by Honduran side F.C. Motagua.

References

External links
Profile at Globo Esporte's Futpedia
Motagua profile 

1973 births
Living people
Brazilian footballers
Real C.D. España players
F.C. Motagua players
Liga Nacional de Fútbol Profesional de Honduras players
Expatriate footballers in Greece
Expatriate footballers in Honduras
Association football forwards
Footballers from São Paulo